Roger Williams (born Louis Jacob Weertz; October 1, 1924 – October 8, 2011) was an American popular music pianist.  Described by the Los Angeles Times as "one of the most popular instrumentalists of the mid-20th century", and "the rare instrumental pop artist to strike a lasting commercial chord," Williams had 22 hit singles–including the chart-topping "Autumn Leaves" in 1955 and "Born Free" in 1966–and 38 hit albums between 1955 and 1972.

He was a Navy boxing champion, played for nine U.S. Presidential administrations, and had a gold Steinway & Sons grand piano model named in his honor.

Biography
Weertz was born in Omaha, Nebraska, to the Rev. Frederick J. Weertz (1891–1980), a Lutheran minister, and Dorothea Bang Weertz (1895–1985), a music teacher. The family moved to Des Moines, Iowa, before his first birthday. He first played the piano at age three.  In high school he became interested in boxing, mainly at his father's insistence, and returned to music only after breaking his nose several times and sustaining several other injuries. As a young man Weertz worked at a Des Moines roller-skating rink, where he played organ music for the patrons.

Weertz majored in piano at Drake University in Des Moines, where he began developing a style that was a fusion of jazz, classical, and pop, but was expelled for playing "Smoke Gets in Your Eyes" in the practice room in violation of the school's classical-music-only policy.  Weertz entered the United States Navy and served in World War II. While still in the Navy he won the middleweight boxing championship at his base in Idaho and earned a bachelor's degree in engineering from Idaho State College (now Idaho State University) in 1950. Afterward, Weertz re-enrolled at Drake, where he earned his master's degree in music in 1951. He then moved to New York City to attend Juilliard, where he studied jazz piano under Lennie Tristano and Teddy Wilson.

During 1951-1952 Weertz won two talent contests: "Arthur Godfrey's Talent Scouts" and Dennis James' Chance of a Lifetime television program. David Kapp, the founder of Kapp Records, heard him play at the Hotel Madison and was so impressed that he signed the pianist, giving him a professional name "that would stand up anywhere", "Roger Williams", after the founder of Rhode Island.

In 1955 Williams recorded "Autumn Leaves", the only piano instrumental to reach #1 on Billboard'''s popular music chart. It sold over two million copies, and was awarded a gold record. In 1966 he had another Top Ten hit with the song "Born Free" from the motion picture soundtrack. His other hits include "Near You",  "Till", "The Impossible Dream", "Yellow Bird", "Maria", and "The Theme from Somewhere in Time" which was part of the film's music score. Billboard magazine ranks him as the top-selling piano recording artist in history, with 21 gold and platinum albums to his credit. Williams was known as the "Pianist to the Presidents", having played for nine US Presidential administrations, beginning with Harry S. Truman – who requested Bach and Ravel, then played his own version of the Chopin waltz. His last White House performance was in November 2008 for a luncheon hosted by First Lady Laura Bush.

On his 75th birthday, Williams performed his first 12-hour piano marathon. He performed marathons at the Steinway Hall in New York City and the Nixon, Carter, and Reagan Presidential Libraries. Williams and Carter were born on the same date and celebrated their mutual 80th birthdays together at the Carter Center when Williams played his marathon there. Williams was a Steinway Artist and was awarded their "Steinway Lifetime Achievement Award." His Steinway & Sons "Roger Williams Limited Edition Gold Steinway" piano was designed by Steinway in his honor. This grand piano was on tour for public display and entertainment during 2007–2008. In 2010, Williams was inducted into the Hit Parade Hall of Fame.

Williams' music was in movie soundtracks: Somewhere in Time (1980), More Than a Miracle (1967), Untamed Heart ("Nature Boy") (1993), Reckless ("O Little Town of Bethlehem") (1995), and The 39th Annual Academy Awards (TV Special) ("Born Free").

Williams developed his caring attitude for his public from a boyhood experience in Des Moines, Iowa. After a piano concert by Ignacy Jan Paderewski, he waited for 45 minutes outside in cold weather to meet Paderewski. When the pianist finally appeared, it was to rush to a waiting automobile. Williams, who had waited, was upset.

I didn't even get near enough to touch him or get an autograph. It was then and there I resolved that if ever I became famous I would never disappoint anyone who wanted to talk to me.

Williams claimed to know 10,000 songs by heart and often took requests. Of his talent, he said: “I know I was given a gift, and once in a while I go to church and say, ‘Hey, thanks.’ I play my religion through my fingers.”

Personal life
Williams was married twice.  His first marriage produced three children.  Both marriages ended in divorce.

In March 2011 Williams posted on his website that he had pancreatic cancer and that his doctors had told him they could not remove the tumor until chemotherapy shrank it to an operable size. He said that he did not plan on canceling any upcoming concerts. He wrote: "What does it all mean? It means I'm in just one more fight  –  the fight for my life... And this much I know, this old Navy boxing champion is going for broke. Just watch me!" He died on October 8, 2011, one week after his 87th birthday.

Singles discography

Discography
 The Boy Next Door (Kapp KL-1003) – 1957
 It's a Big Wide Wonderful World (Kapp KL-1008) – 1958
 Roger Williams with Orchestra (Kapp KL-1012) – 1955
 Daydreams (Kapp KL-1031) – 1955
 Roger Williams Plays the Wonderful Music of the Masters (Kapp KL-1040) – 1956
 Roger Williams Plays Christmas Songs (Kapp KL-1042) – 1956
 Roger Williams Plays Beautiful Waltzes (Kapp KL-1062, KS-3000) – 1957
 Almost Paradise (Kapp KL-1063) – 1957
 Songs of the Fabulous Fifties (Kapp KXL-5000) (2-record set) – 1957
 Songs of the Fabulous Forties (Kapp KXL-5003) (2-record set) – 1957
 Songs of the Fabulous Century (Kapp KXL-5005) (2-record set) – 1958
 Till (Kapp KL-1081) – 1958
 Roger Williams Plays Gershwin (Kapp KL-1088) – 1958
 Near You (Kapp KL-1112) – 1959
 More Songs of the Fabulous Fifties (Kapp KL-1130, KS-3013) – 1959
 With These Hands (Kapp KL-1147, KS-3030) – 1959
 Christmas Time (Kapp KL-1164, KS-3048, MCA-536, MCA-15005) – 1959
 Always – Melodies That Will Live Forever (Kapp KL-1172, KS-3056) – 1960
 Songs of the Fabulous Forties – Part 1 (Kapp KL-1207, KS-3207) – 1960
 Songs of the Fabulous Forties – Part 2 (Kapp KL-1208, KS-3208) – 1960
 Songs of the Fabulous Fifties – Part 1 (Kapp KL-1209, KS-3209) – 1960
 Songs of the Fabulous Fifties – Part 2 (Kapp KL-1210, KS-3210) – 1960
 Songs of the Fabulous Century – Part 1 (Kapp KL-1211, KS-3211) – 1960
 Songs of the Fabulous Century – Part 2 (Kapp KL-1212, KS-3212) – 1960
 Temptation (Kapp KL-1217, KS-3217) – 1960
 Roger Williams Invites You to Dance (Kapp KL-1222, KS-3222) – 1961
 Yellow Bird (Kapp KL-1244, KS-3244) – 1961
 Songs of the Soaring '60s – Vol. 1 (Kapp KL-1251, KS-3251) – 1961
 Roger Williams at Town Hall (Kapp KXL-5008) (2-record set) – 1961
 Greatest Hits (Kapp KL-1260, KS-3260) – 1962
 Maria (Kapp KL-1266, KS-3266) – 1962
 Mr. Piano (Kapp KL-1290, KS-3290) – 1962
 Country Style (Kapp KL-1305) – 1963
 For You (Kapp KL-1336, KS-3336) – 1963
 The Solid Gold Steinway (Kapp KL-1354, KS-3354) – 1964
 By Special Request (Kapp KL-3. KS-3) – 1964
 Roger Williams Family Album of Hymns (Kapp KS-3395)
 Academy Award Winners (Kapp KL-1406, KL-3406) – 1964
 Roger Williams Plays the Hits (Kapp KL-1414, KS-3414) – 1965
 Summer Wind and Your Special Requests (Kapp KL-1434, KS-3434) – 1965
 Autumn Leaves – 1965 (Kapp KL-1452, KS-3452) – 1965
 I'll Remember You (Kapp KL-1470, KS-3470) – 1967
 Somewhere My Love (Kapp KS-3470) – 1967
 Academy Award Winners – Vol. 2 (Kapp KL-1483)
 Born Free (Kapp KL-1501, KS-3501, KTL-3501) – 1966
 Roger! (Kapp KL-1512, KS-3512) – 1967
 Golden Hits (Kapp KL-1530, KS-3530) – 1967
 By Special Request – Vol. 2 (Kapp KL-4, KS-4) – 1967
 Amor (Kapp KS-3549) – 1968
 The Impossible Dream (Kapp KS-3550) – 1968
 More Than a Miracle (Kapp KS-3550)
 Only for Lovers (Kapp KS-3565) – 1968
 Happy Heart (Kapp KS-3595) – 1969
 The Piano Magic of Roger Williams (Columbia Musical Treasuries P2S-5306, P3S-5314) – 1969
 Roger Williams Plays Love Theme from Romeo & Juliet and Other Great Movie Themes (Kapp KS-3610, L3610)
 Themes from Great Movies (Kapp KS-3629) – 1970
 Golden Hits – Vol. 2 (Kapp KS-3638) – 1970
 Magic Moods – Roger Williams/Bert Kaempfert (MCA Special Markets DL-734729) – 1970
 Love Story (Kapp KS-3645) – 1971
 Summer of '42 (The Summer Knows) (Kapp KS-3650) – 1971
 Twilight Themes: 10 All-Time Favorites (Longines Symphonette Society – SYS5329, LS206C, LWS 640) – 1971
 Love Theme from "The Godfather" (Kapp KS-3665) – 1972
 Play Me: Love Themes from "Lady Sings the Blues" (Kapp KS-3671) – 1972
 The Roger Williams Showcase (Kapp KW-900)
 Roger Williams (MCA-324) – 1973
 Roger Williams Live (MCA-378) – 1973
 The Way We Were (MCA-403) – 1974
 I Honestly Love You (MCA-438) – 1975
 Virtuoso (MCA-2175) – 1976
 Nadia's Theme (MCA-2237) – 1976
 The Best of Roger Williams (MCA2-4106, RCA Music Service R-243835) (2-record set) – 1976
 Evergreen (MCA-2279) – 1977
 Autumn Leaves: The Best of Roger Williams (Reader's Digest RDA-187) (8-record set) – 1979
 Golden Christmas (Holiday HDY-1927) – 1981
 Ivory Impact (Bainbridge BT-8002) – 1982
 1970's (MCA2-4180) – 1983
 The Best of the Beautiful (MCAD-5571) – 1985
 To Amadeus with Love (MCAD-5574) – 1985
 Somewhere in Time (Bainbridge BT-6265) – 1986
 Today, My Way (Priority (Capitol) Records SL9323) – 1986
 The Great Love Songs (MCA Special Products 15074) (3-CD set) – 1993
 Golden Christmas (Special Music Company SCD-4607) – 1993
 Sunrise Sunset (MCA, Pickwick SPC-3511)
 Spanish Eyes (MCA, Pickwick SPC-3367)
 Roger Williams & Ferrante and Teicher (Metro M-484)
 Born Free ... and Other Great Romantic Melodies'' (Longines Symphonette Society LS 206-A) (5-record box set)

References

External links
 
 
 
 Text of resolution of Iowa legislature honoring Roger Williams
 Roger Williams page on Nebraska Music Hall of Fame site
 
 Roger Williams Interview NAMM Oral History Library (2006)

1924 births
2011 deaths
American Lutherans
American pop pianists
American male pianists
Easy listening musicians
Juilliard School alumni
United States Navy personnel of World War II
Drake University alumni
Musicians from Des Moines, Iowa
Idaho State University alumni
Deaths from pancreatic cancer
Deaths from cancer in California
Kapp Records artists
Musicians from Iowa
20th-century American pianists
20th-century American male musicians
20th-century Lutherans